Love's Easy Tears is an EP by Scottish dream pop band Cocteau Twins. It was released by 4AD in September 1986 as a 12" single, and was later re-released as a CD single with a fourth track, Orange Appled, included. It was the eighth EP released by the band, their last EP for 4AD, and their last EP until 1993's Snow.

Reception
The EP was critically well received. Michael Fischer of The Michigan Daily described it as "ethereal romanticism" that made "for the closest thing in pop to a music for Gothic cathedrals".

Track listing
All songs written and produced by Cocteau Twins

7": 4AD / AD 610 (UK) 
"Love's Easy Tears" – 3:36 
"Those Eyes, That Mouth" – 3:37

12": 4AD / BAD 610 (UK) 
"Love's Easy Tears" – 3:36 
"Those Eyes, That Mouth" – 3:37
"Sigh's Smell of Farewell" – 3:33

CD: 4AD / BAD 610 CD (UK) 
"Love's Easy Tears" – 3:36 
"Those Eyes, That Mouth" – 3:37
"Sigh's Smell of Farewell" – 3:33 
"Orange Appled" – 2:46

 CD released in 1991

Charts

References

1986 EPs
Cocteau Twins albums
UK Independent Singles Chart number-one singles